Geneva, MN is a live release by Athens, Georgia's Widespread Panic. These performances were recorded live at Harmony Park Music Garden in Geneva, MN on July 4, 2001. This recording features all original band members including late guitarist Michael Houser.

Track listing

July 4, 2001

Disc 1
Henry Parsons Died (Daniel Hutchens / Eric Carter) - 7:38
Who Do You Belong To? (Daniel Hutchens / Eric Carter) - 6:07
Jack (Widespread Panic) - 7:29
The Waker (Widespread Panic) - 7:21
C. Brown (Widespread Panic) - 5:41
Tie Your Shoes (Widespread Panic) - 10:33
Good Morning Little Schoolgirl (H.R. Demarais/D. Level/B. Love/Sonny Boy Williamson II) - 7:23
1 x 1 (John Hermann) - 4:57
Conrad (Widespread Panic) - 8:42

Disc 2
Happy (Widespread Panic) - 9:18
Dyin' Man (Widespread Panic) - 5:17
Airplane (Widespread Panic) - 13:32
Holden Oversoul (Widespread Panic)  - 9:45
Better Off (T Lavitz / Widespread Panic)  - 5:49
One Kind Favor (Son House)  -  16:17

Disc 3
Drums (Widespread Panic) - 14:28
Geneva Jam (Widespread Panic) - 7:04
Four Cornered Room (War) - 3:44
Heathen (Widespread Panic) - 6:06
Four Cornered Room (War) - 2:57
This Part of Town (Widespread Panic) - 5:19
Fishwater (Widespread Panic) - 10:30
Encore
Old Joe (Widespread Panic) - 3:34
Red Beans (Muddy Waters) - 4:28

Personnel

Widespread Panic
  John Bell - Vocals, Guitar
 Michael Houser - Guitar, Vocals
 Dave Schools - Bass
 Todd Nance - Drums
 John "JoJo" Hermann - Keyboards, Vocals
 Domingo "Sunny" Ortiz - Percussion

Staff
 Recorded by Andy Meyer
 Post Production by Micah Gordan

References

External links
 Widespread Panic website
 Widespread Panic Archives Blog

Widespread Panic live albums
2011 live albums